Roti john is an omelette sandwich first believed to be made in Singapore during the 1960s or 1970s. It later became widely popular, spreading throughout the Malay Peninsula in present-day Malaysia and in modern-day Indonesia as street food.

Origin 
The word Roti is derived from the Sanskrit word (rotikā), meaning "bread", and more generally for any bread-based or bread-like food, including sandwiches and pancakes. The origin of john within the name of the dish has not been definitively proven, but may derive from British use of the first name John to address any male person, especially when that person's first name is unknown, difficult to remember or difficult to pronounce, thus a name that may have been used by British armed forces members to address native vendors in British Malaya or vice versa. Oral sources have claimed that the dish and name originated with a Malay cook who lived in Singapore during the early 1970s. Various variations may have existed, but the final version is associated with a stall in the Taman Serasi hawker centre that began serving the dish in 1976, after obtaining the recipe from another hawker. This original stall was moved to Serangoon Garden Market in 2001.

Today, roti john is served throughout the Malay Peninsula, with a popular variation that uses a sardine toppings rather than meat."

Ingredients 
The sandwich is made with a baguette-type loaf with a fried filling of egg, minced meat (chicken, sardine or mutton), and onion, served with tomato-chilli sauce.

Preparation and presentation 

The minced meat, egg and chopped onion mixture is poured into a frying pan and then split long, soft rolls are pressed into the mixture. When the egg is set, the whole roll is then flipped over to toast the other side. The roti is lifted onto a plate, liberally spread with salad, chilli sauce and mayonnaise, before being cut into portions. A variant is to place the minced meat, onions and sauce inside the baguette, dip the baguette into beaten egg, and then fry the whole sandwich in a frying pan.

Variants may use additional or alternative ingredients such as beef, mutton and sardines.

See also 

 Malay cuisine
 List of sandwiches
 Denver sandwich
 St. Paul sandwich

References 

Malay cuisine
Singaporean cuisine
Malaysian breads
Omelettes
Egg sandwiches